"Destin" (meaning "Destiny") is a French-language song by Canadian singer Celine Dion, recorded for her French album, D'eux (1995). It was released as a promotional single in Canada in January 1996. The track was written and produced by Jean-Jacques Goldman.

Background and release
No video was made for the song. The song was a radio hit in Quebec. It entered the Quebec Airplay Chart on 20 January 1996 and peaked at number 3, staying thirty seven weeks on the chart. "Destin" was featured later on Dion's greatest hits compilation On ne change pas (2005). A live version was included on her Live à Paris album, recorded during the D'eux Tour. "Destin" was part of the setlist of Dion's Millennium concert on 31 December 1999. Dion performed the song during the Francophone concerts of her 2008-09 Taking Chances World Tour, included on the French edition of the CD/DVD Taking Chances World Tour: The Concert, and during her historic performance in front of 250,000 spectators to celebrate Quebec's 400th anniversary, which was included on Céline sur les Plaines DVD in 2008.  Dion also performed the song during her Sans attendre Tour; the Quebec City performance was included in the Céline une seule fois / Live 2013 CD/DVD.

Charts

References

1995 songs
1996 singles
Celine Dion songs
Columbia Records singles
French-language songs
Songs written by Jean-Jacques Goldman